Eric Owens may refer to:
 Eric Owens (bass-baritone) (born 1970), American operatic bass-baritone
 Eric Owens (baseball) (born 1971), American baseball outfielder
 Eric Owens (table tennis) (born c 1975), American table tennis player